Valley of the Shadow of Death may refer to:

A phrase as translated into English in the King James Bible version of Psalm 23
The Valley of the Shadow of Death, as described in The Pilgrim's Progress by poet John Bunyan
The Valley of the Shadow of Death, a 2005 album by The Tossers
"Valley of the Shadow of Death", a 1978 single by Throbbing Gristle from D.o.A: The Third and Final Report of Throbbing Gristle
Valley of the Shadow of Death, an 1855 war photograph by Roger Fenton during the Crimean War
"The Valley of the Shadow of Death", alluded to in Narrative of the Life of Frederick Douglass, an American Slave

See also
"In the Shadow of the Valley of Death", a song by Marilyn Manson from Holy Wood (In the Shadow of the Valley of Death)
Valley of the Shadows
Valley of Death (disambiguation)